Otto Langmann (1898-1956) was a German pastor and diplomat.

In November 1923 he married Ilse Siefert, with whom he had four children. He was appointed parish priest in Mecklenburg. In 1928 he went to Colombia and Ecuador. In 1930, in Guatemala, he supported a local evangelical community; a year later he joined the NSDAP and founded the first Nazi group abroad.

He served as the representative of German government in Montevideo, Uruguay (1937-1942) during the Battle of the River Plate in 1939. He held that position until the Uruguayan government broke off relations with Germany.

Publications
 Deutsche Christenheit in der Zeitenwende. Hamburg, Agentur des Rauen Hauses 1933. 77 pages

References

External links
 

1898 births
1956 deaths
German Protestant clergy
Nazi Party members
Ambassadors of Germany to Uruguay
Uruguay in World War II
German emigrants to Guatemala
German emigrants to Uruguay